Spoonfed Hybrid were a dream pop duo in the north of England in the early 1990s.

The band was formed in 1993 by Ian Masters and Chris Trout, initially as The Long Lost. Masters had just left the band he founded in 1987, Pale Saints, which continued without him. Trout had been bass guitarist in A.C. Temple and had published solo and band material under the name Kilgore Trout.

Their self-titled debut album was released that same year through 4AD offshoot label Guernica. A single and mini-album followed before Masters and Trout went their separate ways.

Songs were written by both members of the band, individually and collectively and both sang and played most of the instruments. The first album was produced by Duncan Wheat, with the single and mini-album produced by the band themselves.

Discography
Spoonfed Hybrid Vinyl LP, cassette, and CD (Guernica, 1993)
"Bullets and Bees" / "Messrs Hyde". 7" vinyl. Free with LP version of Spoonfed Hybrid.
"Scary Verlaine" 7" clear vinyl (Le Tatou Colérique, 1995)
Hibernation Shock CD (Farrago Records, 1996)

References

External links
 Christ Trout's website
 Spoonfed Hybrid on MySpace
 The Institute of Spoons (band website)

Musical groups established in 1993
Musical groups disestablished in 1996
4AD artists
Dream pop musical groups
Musical groups from Sheffield
Rock music duos
English musical duos
Indie rock groups from Leeds
Male musical duos